Vaso (Vasily) Ivanovich Abaev (also transliterated as Abayev and Abayti; 15 December 1900 – 18 March 2001) was an ethnically Ossetian Soviet linguist specializing in Iranian, particularly Ossetian linguistics.

Biography

Abaev was born in the village of Kobi, Georgia, Russian Empire.
He studied at the Gymnasium of Tiflis in 1910-1918 and graduated from the Leningrad University in 1925. He studied Iranian philology under Friedman's direction and, as many other young linguists, fell under the influence of the controversial Nicholas Marr, joining Marr's Yaphetic Institute in 1928. After Marr's death, he moved to broad Iranian topics and field work in Ossetia until the end of World War II. In 1945 he moved back to Leningrad where he published his work on the Nart sagas, a dictionary and grammar book of Ossetian. With Joseph Stalin's condemnation of Marr's linguistic theories the Yaphetic Institute was purged, but Abaev was spared.

Starting with the 1950s, Abayev became internationally famous as the leading authority on Scythian and Sarmatian linguistics. Assisted by his friend, Georges Dumézil, Abaev demonstrated connections between the Scythian languages and modern Ossetian.  He also pointed out some striking similarities between Ossetian and Celtic mythology.

In 1960s, he also became known as a determined opponent of structuralism, which he compared to "dehumanization" of linguistics.

His magnum opus, the Etymological Dictionary of Ossetian Language, which is based on the material of 190 languages and dialects, was published in four volumes between 1959 and 1989 and became known outside the USSR as well. He died at the age of 100 in Saint Petersburg. Several years later, a monument to him was unveiled in Tskhinval.

Honours and awards
 Order of Merit for the Fatherland, 3rd class (December 20, 2000) - for outstanding contribution to the development of national science and training of highly qualified and in connection with the 100th anniversary of the birth; 4th class (December 7, 1995) - for services to the state, the progress made in work
 Order of the Red Banner of Labour
 Twice winner of the prize K. Khetagurov
 Honoured Worker of Science of Georgia and North Ossetia
 USSR State Prize - 1981

Footnotes

References
 Alans, Encyclopædia Iranica, V. Abaev and H. W. Bailey
 Vasilij Ivanovič Abaev, TITUS (Thesaurus Indogermanischer Text- und Sprachmaterialien)
 "Grammar of the Ossetian language", by Abaev

External links
 , four volumes plus index
Alans in Encyclopædia Iranica by V. Abaev and H. W. Bailey



1900 births
2001 deaths
20th-century archaeologists
20th-century linguists
People from Mtskheta-Mtianeti
People from Tiflis Governorate
Ossetian people
Linguists from Russia
Russian archaeologists
Caucasologists
Etymologists
Honorary Members of the Russian Academy of Natural Sciences
Russian centenarians
Men centenarians
Recipients of the Order "For Merit to the Fatherland", 3rd class
Recipients of the Order "For Merit to the Fatherland", 4th class
Recipients of the Order of the Red Banner of Labour
Recipients of the USSR State Prize